Yana Morderger (born 7 March 1997) is a German tennis player.

Morderger has a career-high singles ranking of world No. 386, achieved on 20 September 2021, and a highest WTA doubles ranking of 235, reached on 10 February 2020. She has won one singles title and ten doubles titles on the ITF Circuit.

Morderger made her WTA Tour main-draw debut at the 2020 Prague Open, partnering with her twin sister Tayisiya in the doubles event, falling to Lucie Hradecká and Kristýna Plíšková in the first round.

ITF Circuit finals

Singles: 2 (1–1)

Doubles: 26 (11–15)

References

External links
 
 

1997 births
Living people
German female tennis players
Sportspeople from Kyiv
German people of Ukrainian descent